Plantain virus X is a species of virus, part of the Potexvirus viral family. It infects the weed plaintain (Plantago lanceolata). DNA sequencing has shown it to be synonymous with Actinidia virus X, infecting kiwifruit (Actinidia spp.) and blackcurrants (Ribes nigrum). The same research also found Plantain virus X infecting Capsicum annuum (sweet pepper) and the ornamental flower Browallia americana.

References

External links
 

Potexviruses
Viral plant pathogens and diseases